The Ministry of Finance is a government ministry of the Republic of Liberia. , the Liberian Finance Minister is Samuel D. Tweah, who was appointed in January 2018. The minister is appointed by the President of Liberia, with the consent of Senate of Liberia.

The ministry's offices are located in Broad Street in Monrovia.

The ministry was led by a secretary of the treasury before 1972, and since 1972 minister of finance.

Secretaries of the Treasury 
John N. Lewis, 1848-?
Stephen Allen Benson, ?-1856
John C. Chavers, ?-1866-?
Edward J. Roye, ?-?
W. H. Lynch, ?-?
Daniel Beams, ?-1868-1869-?
B. J. K. Anderson, 1870
Edward F. Roye, 1871-?
Frederick Keith Hyde, ?-?
Henry W. Dennis, 1874-1876
James T. Wiles, 1876
John R. Freeman, 1876
B. J. K. Anderson, 1876-1878
William H. Roe, 1878-1883
Moore T. Worrell, 1883-?
Arthur Barclay, 1896–1900
Arthur Barclay, 1900–1903
Daniel Edward Howard, 1904-1912
Thomas W. Haynes, ?-1912
John L. Morris, 1912-?
Walter F. Walker, 1917-1920
J. Jeremiah Harris, 1920-1926-?
Samuel George Harmon, 1928-?
James F. Cooper, ?-1930
John L. Morris, 1930-?
Gabriel Lafayette Dennis, 1932-1940
William E. Dennis, 1944-1958
Charles Dunbar Sherman, 1958-1968
James Milton Weeks, 1968-1971
James Milton Weeks, 1971-1972

Ministers of Finance 
Stephen A. Tolbert, 1972-1975
Edwin Williams, 1975-1976
James T. Phillips, 1976-1979
Ellen Johnson Sirleaf, 1979-1980
Perry G. Zulu, 1980-1981
George K. Dunye, 1981
G. Alvin Jones, 1981-1986
Robert C. Tubman, 1986-1987
John G. Bestman, 1987-1988
David Farhat, 1988-1989
Emmanuel Shaw, 1989-1990
Ellen Johnson Sirleaf, 1990
Byron Tarr, 1990-1992
Francis C. Karpeh, 1992-1994
Wilson Tarpeh, 1994-1995
Lansana Kromah, 1995-1997
Elias Saleeby, 1997-1999
John G. Bestman, 1999
Milton Nathaniel Barnes, 1999-2002
Charles Bright, 2002-2003
Lusine Kamara, 2003-2006
Antoinette Sayeh, 2006-2008
Augustine Kpehe Ngafuan, 2008-2012
Amara Konneh, 2012-2016
Boima Kamara, 2016-2018
Samuel D. Tweah since January 2018

References

External links 
 

Finance
Liberia